"Imperfections" is a song recorded by Canadian singer Celine Dion for her twelfth English-language studio album, Courage (2019). It was written by Lauv, Michael Pollack, Nicholas Perloff-Giles and DallasK, and produced by DallasK. "Imperfections" was released as a digital download on 18 September 2019. The music video premiered on 26 September 2019 and the song impacted adult contemporary radio in the United States on 30 September 2019. "Imperfections" topped the sales and radio charts in Quebec, and received positive reviews from music critics. Dion performed it during her Courage World Tour.

Background and release
"Imperfections" was written by American singer-songwriter Lauv, American DJ-producer DallasK, Michael Pollack and Nicholas Perloff-Giles, and produced by DallasK. Together with the songs "Lying Down" and "Courage", it was released as a digital download on 18 September 2019, the day Dion started her Courage World Tour, promoting her album Courage. "Imperfections" is a mid-tempo dance track with an electronic beat, which focuses on self-criticism. It impacted adult contemporary radio in the United States on 30 September 2019. On 7 December 2019, "Imperfections" was added under the B-list on BBC Radio 2 airplay playlist in the United Kingdom. On 26 February 2020, a new stripped-down version of "Imperfections" was released on Spotify, along with Dion's cover of "Wicked Game" with Chris Isaak.

Critical reception
The song received positive critical reviews. According to A Bit of Pop Music, "Imperfections" is a good song with contemporary radio pop production. It is very 2019 and very Celine Dion at the same time. Lyrics are simple, same as Dion's vocals. Mike Wass from Idolator described "Imperfections" as Dion's most contemporary-sounding song in years, with catchy chorus about self-reflection: "I've got my own imperfections, I got my own set of scars to hide".

Commercial performance
In Quebec, "Imperfections" topped the radio chart for 15 weeks and the sales chart for five weeks. In Canada, it reached number five on the Adult Contemporary chart, number 40 on the Hot Adult Contemporary chart, and number 69 on the Canadian Hot 100. In the United States, "Imperfections" peaked at number 11 on the Adult Contemporary chart and number 23 on Pop Digital Song Sales. It also peaked at number 17 in Belgium Wallonia, number 32 in Croatia, number 43 on the sales chart in France and number 97 in Scotland.

Music video
The music video for "Imperfections" was directed by Gabriel Coutu-Dumont and produced by Sailor Productions/Silent Partners Studio. It was shot entirely in black and white, with Dion taking over the screen in various gowns and high-end ensembles. The music video was released on 26 September 2019. Emily Zemler from Rolling Stone called it evocative, with glamorous, behind-the-scenes Hollywood aesthetic, which is juxtaposed with the lyrics as Dion reflects on self-criticism, noting, "I got my own imperfections". At the end of the music video, Dion appears completely without makeup, which is in sync with the message of the song: "I got my own imperfections/I got my own set of scars to hide/I got my own imperfections/I can't hold your heart when I'm fixing mine".

Nicholas Hautman from Us Weekly called it stunning in everything from a puffy black dress to a strapless white gown. "As the song continues to play, Dion heads back to her dressing room and takes a makeup wipe to her face, baring her natural beauty", he continued. Rebecca Alter from Vulture.com said it was "perfect" continuing, "queen Celine does a frankly abysmal job convincing us that she's anything but perfect, singing in a perfect voice about her inadequacies while stunting in couture perfectly. The drama of her body language in billowing sleeves? Heaven. Her stripes and oversize polka dots and large hat wide-stanced Cirque du Soleil fashion narrative? Art. Her running, Bird Box blindfolded, toward the camera in black-and-white like a high-glamour human embodiment of that old-timey movie of the train driving toward the audience? The Lumière brothers wish! We know she's perfect." she said.

Credits and personnel

Ari Leff – composer, lyricist, associated  performer
Dallas Koehlke – composer, lyricist, producer, associated  performer, background vocal, recording engineer
Michael Pollack – composer, lyricist, associated  performer, background vocal
Nicholas Perloff-Giles – composer, lyricist
Alyssa Lourdiz Cantu – background vocal
François Lalonde – recording engineer
Serban Ghenea – mixing engineer
Vlado Meller – mastering engineer
John McL. Doelp – executive producer

Source:

Charts

Weekly charts

Year-end charts

Release history

References

External links

2019 singles
2019 songs
2010s ballads
Celine Dion songs
Columbia Records singles
Pop ballads
Black-and-white music videos
Songs written by Lauv
Songs written by Michael Pollack (musician)
Songs written by DallasK